The 1960 United States presidential election in Maine took place on November 8, 1960, as part of the 1960 United States presidential election, which was held throughout all 50 states. Voters chose five representatives, or electors to the Electoral College, who voted for president and vice president.

Maine voted for the Republican nominee, Vice President Richard Nixon of California, over the Democratic nominee, Senator John F. Kennedy of Massachusetts. Nixon's ran with Ambassador Henry Cabot Lodge, Jr. of Massachusetts, while Kennedy ran with Senate Majority Leader Lyndon B. Johnson of Texas.

Nixon carried Maine by a margin of 14.1%. As of the 2020 presidential election, this marks the last time Maine voted for a different candidate than Connecticut, as well as the last time that Maine voted to the right of Idaho.

Results

Results by county

See also
 United States presidential elections in Maine

References

Maine
1960
1960 Maine elections